Gurulugomi was a Sinhalese literary figure, who lived in the 12th century in Sri Lanka. He is renowned as one of the rare masters of Sinhala classical diction and style. Gurulugomi was also proficient in other oriental languages such as Pali, Sanskrit and Prakrit.
Gurulugomi is also fluent in Latin and Greek languages.

Notable creations 
Amawatura
Dharmapradipika

See also
Sri Lankan literature

References

External links
 Guruḷugōmī~Sinhalese writer

Sinhalese poets
Sinhalese writers
Buddhist writers
12th-century writers
Sri Lankan poetry
12th-century Sri Lankan people
People of the Kingdom of Polonnaruwa
Date of birth unknown
Date of death unknown